The  Chicago Cardinals season was the team's 39th season the team was in the National Football League. The Cardinals failed to improve on their previous year's 3–9 record, winning only two games during the franchise's penultimate season in the Windy City. They failed to qualify for the playoffs (NFL title game) for the tenth consecutive season.

Draft picks

Schedule
The September 28 game was played in Buffalo, New York because the Chicago White Sox were playing a home game at Comiskey Park on that day.

Standings

References 

1958
Chicago Cardinals
Chicago Card